Kosmos 380 ( meaning Cosmos 380), known before launch as DS-P1-Yu No.26, was a Soviet satellite which was launched in 1970 as part of the Dnepropetrovsk Sputnik programme. It was a  spacecraft, which was built by the Yuzhnoye Design Bureau, and was used as a radar calibration target for anti-ballistic missile tests.

Launch 
Kosmos 380 was successfully launched into low Earth orbit on 24 November 1970, with the rocket lifting off at 10:59:56 UTC. The launch took place from Site 133/1 at the Plesetsk Cosmodrome, and used a Kosmos-2I 63SM carrier rocket. Upon reaching orbit, it was assigned its Kosmos designation, and received the International Designator 1970-100A.

Orbit 
Kosmos 380 was the thirty-seventh of seventy nine DS-P1-Yu satellites to be launched, and the thirty-fourth of seventy two to successfully reach orbit. It remained in orbit until it decayed and reentered the atmosphere on 17 June 1971.

References

Kosmos satellites
Spacecraft launched in 1970
1970 in the Soviet Union
Dnepropetrovsk Sputnik program